Kannanthanam is a surname. Notable people with the surname include: 

Alphons Kannanthanam (born 1953), Indian civil servant, lawyer, and politician
Thampi Kannanthanam (1953−2018), Indian film director, screenwriter, producer, and actor

Indian surnames